Richard Jackson, KC (c. 1721 – 6 May 1787), nicknamed "Omniscient Jackson", was a British lawyer and politician who sat in the House of Commons  from 1762 to 1784. A King's Counsel, he acted as Official Solicitor or counsel of the Lords Commissioners for Trade and Plantations, owner of lands in New England, and colonial agent of Connecticut. 

Jackson was called to the bar in 1744; he became a bencher of Lincoln's Inn in 1770 and its treasurer in 1780.  He was a teacher of law in the Inner and Middle Temples; among his students was William Franklin, son of Benjamin Franklin.  Jackson was a collaborator in Franklins' political interests during their London years. He was also Member of Parliament for Weymouth and Melcombe Regis from 1762 to 1768 and for New Romney from 1768 until 1784, and was one of the Lords of the Treasury from 1782 to 1783. In 1781, he was elected a Fellow of the Society of Antiquaries.

References
Robert Beatson, "A Chronological Register of Both Houses of Parliament" (London: Longman, Hurst, Res & Orme, 1807) 
Concise Dictionary of National Biography

1720s births
1787 deaths
Members of the Parliament of Great Britain for English constituencies
Fellows of the Society of Antiquaries of London
Members of Lincoln's Inn
British MPs 1761–1768
British MPs 1768–1774
British MPs 1774–1780
British MPs 1780–1784
Alumni of Queens' College, Cambridge